U.S. Route 65 (US 65) is a north–south U.S. highway that runs from Clayton, Louisiana to Albert Lea, Minnesota. In Missouri, the highway enters the state from Arkansas, just south of Branson. The highway exits the state into Iowa near South Lineville.

Route description
US 65 enters Missouri between the towns of Omaha, Arkansas and Ridgedale, Missouri. The road is a four-lane expressway, traveling through both Branson and Hollister towards Springfield. Through the Branson area, it is a freeway. North of Branson, the highway intersections with both westbound Route 76 (a freeway spur) and U.S. Route 160. All the way to Highlandville, U.S. 160 is the old alignment of U.S. 65 (until the 1960s).

Just south of Route EE at the Highlandville exit, U.S. 65 returns to freeway status. The freeway is called "Schoolcraft Freeway" in Springfield, named in honor of Henry Rowe Schoolcraft.  Also in Springfield, the highway has junctions with U.S. Route 60 (also known as James River Freeway) and Interstate 44 (I-44). The I-44 interchange includes a flyover ramp connecting northbound U.S. 65 with westbound I-44. Construction is completed that added two at U.S. 60. In September 2011, U.S. 65 became a six-lane divided freeway in Springfield between Interstate 44 and U.S. 60. It was the first six-lane highway in Southwest Missouri. North of Springfield, it returns to a four-lane, non-interstate highway.

From Springfield to Buffalo, U.S. 65 has been upgraded as a four-lane non-interstate highway. This project began with the addition of a partial four-lane highway through the Fair Grove area to replace a dangerous traffic light intersection with an overpass. It culminated with the entire length of U.S. 65 becoming a four-lane highway from Springfield to just outside of Buffalo. The project was completed in summer 2010.

Through Buffalo, the highway now becomes two lanes with a center left-turn lane. This part of the highway has also seen upgrades in recent years, such as adding rumble strips and extending the middle turn lanes to just outside the city's northern portion.

From Buffalo to Preston, entering Hickory County, U.S. 65 remains a two-lane highway and has a four-way intersection with U.S. Route 54.

U.S. 65 shares a concurrency with Route 7 before entering Warsaw, where the highway crosses over the western end of the Lake of the Ozarks and again becomes a four-lane non-interstate highway at the intersection where it separates from Route 7. After leaving Warsaw, U.S. 65 passes through Lincoln then has a brief concurrency with Route 52.

At Sedalia (where it is called Limit Avenue), it has an intersection with U.S. Route 50 (known locally as Broadway Blvd). At Marshall Junction, north of Sedalia in Saline County, U.S. 65 intersects with both Interstate 70 and U.S. Route 40. In Marshall (where it is called Lexington, Ave), U.S. 65 returns to two-lanes and stays so all the way up to Iowa. At Waverly, the highway becomes concurrent with U.S. Route 24 (which continues to Carrollton). Also in Waverly, U.S. 65 and U.S. 24 both cross the Missouri River on the Waverly Bridge. Further north, the road crosses U.S. Route 36 at Chillicothe and U.S. Route 136 at Princeton. The highway leaves Missouri at South Lineville and enters Iowa.

The section of highway from Preston to Marshall Junction has been cited as a good drive for motorcyclists, with its sparsely populated areas and the hilly landscape.

History

From 1922 to 1926, US 65 in Missouri was known as Route 3. US 65 originally followed Route 248 and US 160 between Branson and Springfield. Route 3 was originally planned on a shorter route between Springfield and Preston, with Route 71 on the longer alignment via Buffalo, but Route 3 was quickly shifted east, absorbing Route 71.

Major intersections

See also

References

External links

 

 Missouri
65
Transportation in Springfield, Missouri
Transportation in Taney County, Missouri
Transportation in Christian County, Missouri
Transportation in Greene County, Missouri
Transportation in Dallas County, Missouri
Transportation in Hickory County, Missouri
Transportation in Benton County, Missouri
Transportation in Pettis County, Missouri
Transportation in Saline County, Missouri
Transportation in Lafayette County, Missouri
Transportation in Carroll County, Missouri
Transportation in Livingston County, Missouri
Transportation in Grundy County, Missouri
Transportation in Mercer County, Missouri